Brian Thomas Isaac (born 1950) is a Syilx writer from Canada, whose debut novel All the Quiet Places was published in 2021.

A member of the Okanagan Indian Band, Isaac grew up on the Okanagan reserve near Vernon. He worked in logging, bricklaying and the oil industry as an adult, pursuing writing strictly as a personal hobby until his retirement in the early 2000s, following which his wife Marlene submitted a piece of his writing to a writers' festival in Penticton, at which he won an award. 

All the Quiet Places was published by Touchwood Editions in fall 2021. It was shortlisted for the 2022 Amazon.ca First Novel Award and the Governor General's Award for English-language fiction at the 2022 Governor General's Awards, and longlisted for the 2022 Giller Prize. It was also the winner of the Indigenous Voices Award for published prose in English.

References

1950 births
Living people
21st-century Canadian novelists
21st-century Canadian male writers
21st-century First Nations writers
Canadian male novelists
First Nations novelists
Syilx people
Writers from British Columbia